ArmaTrac is the tractor brand of Erkunt Tractor, the tractor division of the Erkunt group owned by the Indian giant Mahindra & Mahindra.

History 

The manufacturer company Erkunt, was established in 1953 in Turkey, as a general foundry & pattern shop. By 1955, it had become a factory for machining parts as well as casting. The factory was chiefly engaged in the production of waste water pipes to NATO standards. Following eight years of growth in 1961 the company became a corporation. Erkunt was then producing intermediate goods for the automotive, agricultural tractor and motor industries, utilizing the most advanced technology of the day.

Erkunt has grown to employ 174 white collar and 851 blue collar workers, totalling 1025 in a 60,000 ton/year capacity complex that is the leader in Turkey for grey iron and nodular casting production and mechanical processing.

For the past 20 years the company has been exporting to Europe. Production has grown to 60,000 tons per year. Erkunt exports 85% of total production of which 76% is machined, and 24% is raw castings. The products of company has ISO/TS 16949 and the company registered to ISO 9001 and one of the largest independent casting and machining company in Europe.

In 2003, Erkunt Group started the tractor division with the establishment of Erkunt Tractor Industries, Inc. and became a member of OEM group.

Erkunt Tractor started manufacturing tractors in September 2004. In the following 6 years, 8268 tractors were sold in domestic market through 73 dealers and 105 sales points. The company, which entered the market with only two models, is now able to offer 46 different models between 50 and 110 hp, to potential customers in different countries. At the end of year 2010, Erkunt's market share in Turkey is 18% and is the second biggest tractor manufacturer in Turkey. Erkunt distributes tractors under ArmaTrac brand in international markets and works on distributorship basis. Currently, Erkunt has distributors in United Kingdom, Latvia, Bulgaria, Hungary, Cyprus, Serbia, Poland and Croatia in Europe as well as Yemen, Senegal, Jordan, Algeria in Africa; Antigua Barbuda in America.

The tractors are designed by Turkish engineers, which is a first in tractor market of Turkey, as most other manufacturers build them under license. The tractors can also be designed for different countries, in order to meet the market's needs. The tractors use ZF and Carraro transmissions built under license by them in Turkey.

References

Tractors
Turkish brands
Mahindra Group